Peduovirus (also known as P2-like phages and P2-like viruses) is a genus of viruses in the order Caudovirales, in the family Myoviridae, in the subfamily Peduovirinae. Bacteria serve as natural hosts, with transmission achieved through passive diffusion. There are 15 species in this genus.

Taxonomy
The following species are recognized:

Citrobacter virus R18C
Escherichia virus 12474III
Escherichia virus fiAA91ss
Escherichia virus magyaro
Escherichia virus P2
Escherichia virus P2-2H1
Escherichia virus P2-2H4
Escherichia virus P2-4A7b
Escherichia virus P2-4B2
Escherichia virus P2-4C9
Escherichia virus P2-4E6b
Escherichia virus pro147
Escherichia virus pro483
Escherichia virus Wphi
Yersinia virus L413C

Structure
Peduoviruses are nonenveloped, with a head and tail. The icosahedral head is approximately 60 nm in diameter and a dextral symmetry (T=7), composed of 72 capsomers. The tail is around 135 nm long, 18 nm wide, has 6 short, kinked tail fibers. The tail is enclosed in a sheath, which loosens and slides around the tail core upon contraction.

Genome
Nine of the viruses' genomes have been fully sequenced and are available on NCBI's website (though Salmonella phage Fels-2 is currently listed as unclassified). They range between 30k and 39k nucleotides, with 40 to 51 proteins. Complete genomes, as well as several additional "unclassified" virus genomes, are available at

Life cycle
Viral replication is cytoplasmic. The virus attaches to the host cell using its tail fibers, and ejects the viral DNA into the host cytoplasm via contraction of its tail sheath. DNA-templated transcription is the method of transcription. Once the viral genes have been replicated, the procapsid is assembled and packed. The tail is then assembled and the mature virions are released via lysis and holin/endolysin/spanin proteins.

History
According to ICTV's 1996 report, the genus P2likevirus was first accepted under the name P2-like phages in the family Myoviridae, unassigned to a sub-family. The genus name was changed to P2-like viruses in the ICTV 7th Report in 1999. It was moved into the subfamily Peduovirinae upon its inception in 2010-11. The following year (2012), the genus was renamed to P2likevirus. These reports are available through ICTV here: 1996, 1999, 2010, 2012.
 The genus was later renamed to ''Peduovirus'.

References

External links
 Viralzone: P2likevirus
 ICTV

Peduovirinae
Virus genera